Chekalin, formerly known as Likhvin until 1945, is a town in Suvorovsky District of Tula Oblast, Russia, located on the left bank of the Oka River. Population:  In 2010 it was the least populous inhabited locality in Russia with town status. Now, however, the smallest town in Russia is Innopolis with 96 inhabitants according to the 2016 Census.

As of 2020 the population was reported to be 863.

History
During World War II, Likhvin was under German occupation from 19 October 1941 until 26 December 1941. In 1944, Likhvin was renamed Chekalin in honor of Soviet partisan Alexander Chekalin.

Administrative and municipal status
Within the framework of administrative divisions, it is incorporated within Suvorovsky District as Chekalin Town Under District Jurisdiction. As a municipal division, Chekalin Town Under District Jurisdiction is incorporated within Suvorovsky Municipal District as Chekalin Urban Settlement.

References

Sources

Notes

External links
Official website of Chekalin 
Chekalin Business Directory 

Cities and towns in Tula Oblast
Likhvinsky Uyezd